The Internet Sacred Text Archive (ISTA) is a Santa Cruz, California-based website dedicated to the preservation of electronic public domain religious texts.

History
The website was first opened to the public on March 9, 1999 by John Bruno Hare (July 8, 1955 – April 27, 2010), in Santa Cruz, California. Hare started building the website from his home  in the late 1990s, as "an intellectual challenge". At the time, he was working as a software engineer with a dot-com company, and started by scanning over 1,000 public domain books on religion, folklore and mythology. The reason for its founding was the promotion of religious tolerance through knowledge. Its texts are organized into 77 different categories. The maintenance costs for the website—which  received anywhere from five hundred thousand to two million visits a day—are funded by sales of the website on DVD, CD-ROM, or USB flash drive for monetary donations.

Contents
The Internet Sacred Text Archive lists three general links, World Religions, Traditions, and Mysteries. The first leads to the texts of the Abrahamic religions, as well as secondary sources describing them. The second leads to indigenous religions, including transcriptions of oral myths. The third leads to Nostradamus's writings, descriptions of Atlantis, and pagan texts. The main page has a site map that is organized alphabetically.

See also 
 Christian Classics Ethereal Library
 List of digital library projects
 New Advent
 Wikisource

References

External links 
 The Internet Sacred Text Archive
 

1999 establishments in California
American digital libraries
Companies based in Santa Cruz County, California
Internet properties established in 1999
Preservation (library and archival science)